Preggoland is a 2014 Canadian comedy film directed by Jacob Tierney and written by Sonja Bennett. The film stars Bennett as Ruth, a 35-year-old single woman who falsely claims to be pregnant to deflect her friends' and family's mounting disapproval of her directionless, irresponsible lifestyle.

The film's cast also includes James Caan, Danny Trejo, Paul Campbell, Laura Harris, Jared Keeso, Lisa Durupt, Carrie Ruscheinsky and Denise Jones.

The film premiered on September 5, 2014 in the Special Presentations section of the 2014 Toronto International Film Festival.

Cast
 Sonja Bennett as Ruth Huxley
 James Caan as Walter Huxley
 Laura Harris as Shannon
 Carrie Ruscheinsky as Deb
 Denise Jones as Cherry
 Danny Trejo as Pedro
 Jade Loring as Libby
 Olive Collingwood as Madison
 Chance Hurstfield as Oliver
 Brittney Wilson as Tina
 Jessica McLeod as Liz

Release
The film had its world premiere on September 5, 2014 in the Special Presentations section at the 2014 Toronto International Film Festival. The film also screened at the Vancouver International Film Festival, Cinéfest Sudbury International Film Festival and Calgary International Film Festival.

The film had its US premiere on January 28, 2015 at the Santa Barbara International Film Festival.

The film's Canadian distribution rights were acquired by Mongrel Media, who would handle the film's theatrical release in Canada in spring 2015. Following the film's premiere at the 2014 Toronto International Film Festival, Lightning Entertainment acquired the film's international distribution rights.

Critical response
On review aggregation website Rotten Tomatoes, 47% of 19 critics' reviews are positive, with an average rating of 5.3/10. Metacritic, which uses a weighted average, has given the film a score of 45 out of 100, based on 5 critics, indicating "mixed or average reviews".

Awards

The film was nominated for Best Canadian Feature Film and won the Most Popular Canadian Film Award at the 2014 Vancouver International Film Festival. In January 2015, the film was nominated for Best British Columbia Film at the Vancouver Film Critics Circle Awards. In March 2015 the film won the Best Screenplay Award at the Fargo Film Festival and won the Audience Choice Award for Best Feature at the Omaha Film Festival.

References

External links
 
 
 
 Preggoland at Library and Archives Canada

2014 films
2014 comedy films
Canadian comedy films
English-language Canadian films
Films directed by Jacob Tierney
2010s pregnancy films
Canadian pregnancy films
2010s English-language films
2010s Canadian films